This is a listing of sessions of the Parliament of Great Britain, tabulated with the elections to the House of Commons of Great Britain for each session, and the list of members of the House.

The sessions are numbered from the formation of the Kingdom of Great Britain.  For later Westminster parliaments, see List of parliaments of the United Kingdom, and for earlier ones, see List of parliaments of England and List of parliaments of Scotland.

See also
Duration of English parliaments before 1660
Duration of English, British and United Kingdom parliaments from 1660
List of parliaments of England
List of parliaments of Scotland
List of parliaments of the United Kingdom
List of British governments

External links
 Robert Beatson, A Chronological Register of Both Houses of the British Parliament, from the Union in 1708, to the Third Parliament of the United Kingdom of Great Britain and Ireland, in 1807: From the Union in 1708, to the Third Parliament Of the United Kingdom Of Great Britain and Ireland in 1807, Volume 1, printed for Longman, Hurst, Rees, and Orme by J. Chalmers & Co., 1807;   (PDF)